Grzegorz Cziura (3 January 1952 in Knurów – 17 July 2004 in Siemianowice Śląskie) was a Polish weightlifter who competed in the 1972 Summer Olympics and in the 1976 Summer Olympics.

References

1952 births
2004 deaths
Polish male weightlifters
Olympic weightlifters of Poland
Weightlifters at the 1972 Summer Olympics
Weightlifters at the 1976 Summer Olympics
Olympic silver medalists for Poland
Olympic medalists in weightlifting
People from Knurów
Sportspeople from Silesian Voivodeship
Medalists at the 1976 Summer Olympics
21st-century Polish people
20th-century Polish people